The Venturi effect is the reduction in fluid pressure that results when a fluid flows through a constricted section (or choke) of a pipe. The Venturi effect is named after its discoverer, the 18th-century Italian physicist Giovanni Battista Venturi.

Background
In inviscid fluid dynamics, an incompressible fluid's velocity must increase as it passes through a constriction in accord with the principle of mass continuity, while its static pressure must decrease in accord with the principle of conservation of mechanical energy (Bernoulli's principle). Thus, any gain in kinetic energy a fluid may attain by its increased velocity through a constriction is balanced by a drop in pressure.

By measuring pressure, the flow rate can be determined, as in various flow measurement devices such as Venturi meters, Venturi nozzles and orifice plates.

Referring to the adjacent diagram, using Bernoulli's equation in the special case of steady, incompressible, inviscid flows (such as the flow of water or other liquid, or low-speed flow of gas) along a streamline, the theoretical pressure drop at the constriction is given by

where  is the density of the fluid,  is the (slower) fluid velocity where the pipe is wider,  is the (faster) fluid velocity where the pipe is narrower (as seen in the figure).

Choked flow
The limiting case of the Venturi effect is when a fluid reaches the state of choked flow, where the fluid velocity approaches the local speed of sound. When a fluid system is in a state of choked flow, a further decrease in the downstream pressure environment will not lead to an increase in velocity, unless the fluid is compressed.  

The mass flow rate for a compressible fluid will increase with increased upstream pressure, which will increase the density of the fluid through the constriction (though the velocity will remain constant).  This is the principle of operation of a de Laval nozzle. Increasing source temperature will also increase the local sonic velocity, thus allowing increased mass flow rate, but only if the nozzle area is also increased to compensate for the resulting decrease in density.

Expansion of the section

The Bernoulli equation is invertible, and pressure should rise when a fluid slows down. Nevertheless, if there is an expansion of the tube section, turbulence will appear, and the theorem will not hold. In all experimental Venturi tubes, the pressure in the entrance is compared to the pressure in the middle section; the output section is never compared with them.

Experimental apparatus

Venturi tubes
The simplest apparatus is a tubular setup known as a Venturi tube or simply a Venturi (plural: "Venturis" or occasionally "Venturies").  Fluid flows through a length of pipe of varying diameter.  To avoid undue aerodynamic drag, a Venturi tube typically has an entry cone of 30 degrees and an exit cone of 5 degrees.

Venturi tubes are often used in processes where permanent pressure loss is not tolerable and where maximum accuracy is needed in case of highly viscous liquids.

Orifice plate
Venturi tubes are more expensive to construct than simple orifice plates, and both function on the same basic principle. However, for any given differential pressure, orifice plates cause significantly more permanent energy loss.

Instrumentation and measurement
Both Venturi tubes and orifice plates are used in industrial applications and in scientific laboratories for measuring the flow rate of liquids.

Flow rate
A Venturi can be used to measure the volumetric flow rate, using Bernoulli's principle.

Since

then

A Venturi can also be used to mix a liquid with a gas. If a pump forces the liquid through a tube connected to a system consisting of a Venturi to increase the liquid speed (the diameter decreases), a short piece of tube with a small hole in it, and last a Venturi that decreases speed (so the pipe gets wider again), the gas will be sucked in through the small hole because of changes in pressure. At the end of the system, a mixture of liquid and gas will appear. See aspirator and pressure head for discussion of this type of siphon.

Differential pressure

As fluid flows through a Venturi, the expansion and compression of the fluids cause the pressure inside the Venturi to change. This principle can be used in metrology for gauges calibrated for differential pressures. This type of pressure measurement may be more convenient, for example, to measure fuel or combustion pressures in jet or rocket engines.

The first large-scale Venturi meters to measure liquid flows were developed by Clemens Herschel who used them to measure small and large flows of water and wastewater beginning at the end of the 19th century. While working for the Holyoke Water Power Company, Herschel would develop the means for measuring these flows to determine the water power consumption of different mills on the Holyoke Canal System, first beginning development of the device in 1886, two years later he would describe his invention of the Venturi meter to William Unwin in a letter dated June 5, 1888.

Compensation for temperature, pressure, and mass
Fundamentally, pressure-based meters measure kinetic energy density. Bernoulli's equation (used above) relates this to mass density and volumetric flow,

where constant terms are absorbed into k. Using the definitions of density, molar concentration, and molar mass, one can also derive mass flow or molar flow (i.e. standard volume flow),

However, measurements outside the design point must compensate for the effects of temperature, pressure, and molar mass on density and concentration. The ideal gas law is used to relate actual values to design values,

Substituting these two relations into the pressure-flow equations above yields the fully compensated flows,

Q, m, or n are easily isolated by dividing and taking the square root. Note that pressure-, temperature-, and mass-compensation is required for every flow, regardless of the end units or dimensions. Also we see the relations,

Examples
The Venturi effect may be observed or used in the following:

Machines
 During Underway replenishment the helmsman of each ship must constantly steer away from the other ship due to the Venturi effect, otherwise they will collide.
 Cargo eductors on oil product and chemical ship tankers
 Inspirators mix air and flammable gas in grills, gas stoves, Bunsen burners and airbrushes
 Water aspirators produce a partial vacuum using the kinetic energy from the faucet water pressure
 Steam siphons use the kinetic energy from the steam pressure to create a partial vacuum
 Atomizers disperse perfume or spray paint (i.e. from a spray gun)
 Carburetors use the effect to suck gasoline into an engine's intake air stream
 Cylinder heads in piston engines have multiple Venturi areas like the valve seat and the port entrance
 Wine aerators infuse air into wine as it is poured into a glass
 Protein skimmers filter saltwater aquaria
 Automated pool cleaners use pressure-side water flow to collect sediment and debris
 Clarinets use a reverse taper to speed the air down the tube, enabling better tone, response and intonation
 The leadpipe of a trombone, affecting the timbre
 Industrial vacuum cleaners use compressed air
 Venturi scrubbers are used to clean flue gas emissions
 Injectors (also called ejectors) are used to add chlorine gas to water treatment chlorination systems
 Steam injectors use the Venturi effect and the latent heat of evaporation to deliver feed water to a steam locomotive boiler.
 Sandblasting nozzles accelerate and air and media mixture
 Bilge water can be emptied from a moving boat through a small waste gate in the hull. The air pressure inside the moving boat is greater than the water sliding by beneath.
 A scuba diving regulator uses the Venturi effect to assist maintaining the flow of gas once it starts flowing
 In recoilless rifles to decrease the recoil of firing
 The diffuser on an automobile
 Race cars utilising ground effect to increase downforce and thus become capable of higher cornering speeds
 Foam proportioners used to induct fire fighting foam concentrate into fire protection systems
 Trompe air compressors entrain air into a falling column of water
 The bolts in some brands of paintball markers
 Low-speed wind tunnels can be considered very large Venturi because they take advantage of the Venturi effect to increase velocity and decrease pressure to simulate expected flight conditions.

Architecture
 Hawa Mahal of Jaipur, also utilizes the Venturi effect, by allowing cool air to pass through, thus making the whole area more pleasant during the high temperatures in summer.
 Large cities where wind is forced between buildings - the gap between the Twin Towers of the original World Trade Center was an extreme example of the phenomenon, which made the ground level plaza notoriously windswept. In fact, some gusts were so high that pedestrian travel had to be aided by ropes.

Nature
 In windy mountain passes, resulting in erroneous pressure altimeter readings
The Mistral wind in southern France increases in speed through the Rhone valley.

See also
 Joule–Thomson effect

References

External links

3D animation of the Differential Pressure Flow Measuring Principle (Venturi meter)

Use of the Venturi effect for gas pumps to know when to turn off (video)

Fluid dynamics